Jacques Marie Stanislas Jean Brugnon (11 May 1895 – 20 March 1978), nicknamed "Toto", was a French tennis player, one of the famous "Four Musketeers" from France who dominated tennis in the late 1920s and early 1930s. He was born in and died in Paris.

He was primarily a doubles specialist who won 10 Grand Slam doubles titles in the French, American, Australian and British championships. Additionally he won two mixed doubles titles at Roland Garros partnering Suzanne Lenglen. He was also a fine singles player but never won a Major title. He played in 20 Wimbledon Championships between 1920 and 1948 and achieved his best singles result in 1926 when he reached the semifinals, losing in a close five set match to Howard Kinsey. He also competed at the 1920 Summer Olympics and the 1924 Summer Olympics.

Between 1921 and 1934 he played 31 ties for the French Davis Cup team, mainly as a doubles player, and compiled a record of 26 wins versus 11 losses. He was part of the famous Four Musketeers team that conquered the Cup in 1927 against the US and of four of the five teams that defended it successfully until 1932.

Brugnon was ranked World No. 9 for 1927 by A. Wallis Myers of The Daily Telegraph.

The Four Musketeers were inducted simultaneously into the International Tennis Hall of Fame in Newport, Rhode Island, in 1976.

Grand Slam finals

Doubles (10 titles, 7 runner-ups)

Mixed doubles (2 titles)

References

External links
 
 
 
 
 
 
 

1895 births
1978 deaths
Australian Championships (tennis) champions
French Championships (tennis) champions
French male tennis players
Olympic silver medalists for France
Olympic tennis players of France
Tennis players from Paris
International Tennis Hall of Fame inductees
Tennis players at the 1920 Summer Olympics
Tennis players at the 1924 Summer Olympics
Wimbledon champions (pre-Open Era)
Olympic medalists in tennis
Grand Slam (tennis) champions in mixed doubles
Grand Slam (tennis) champions in men's doubles
Medalists at the 1924 Summer Olympics